Fred Henriques Silva Lopes (born 15 June 1994) is a Cape Verdean football player who plays for Famalicão.

Club career
He made his professional debut in the Segunda Liga for Famalicão on 6 August 2016 in a game against Leixões.

References

1994 births
Living people
Cape Verdean footballers
G.D. Tourizense players
Cape Verdean expatriate footballers
Expatriate footballers in Portugal
Sertanense F.C. players
F.C. Famalicão players
Liga Portugal 2 players
Association football midfielders